Glass House Mountains Road (Steve Irwin Way) is a continuous  road route in the Moreton Bay and Sunshine Coast local government areas of Queensland, Australia. Part of it is designated as part of State Route 6. It is a state-controlled road (number 490), part regional and part district.

Route description
It leaves Beerburrum and passes through  before entering , where it passes the exits to Kilcoy–Beerwah Road to the west and Roys Road to the east. Here it becomes State Route 6 and Tourist Drive 24, and continues to the north, passing Australia Zoo, and then north-east as it reaches . The physical road continues east as Caloundra Road (State Route 6).

Land use along the road is mainly rural.

Road condition
The road is fully sealed, and most of it is two-lane road, with some isolated four-lane segments.

Upgrade project
A project to improve safety between Beerwah and Landsborough, at a cost of $24 million, was under construction in July 2022.

Related Bruce Highway projects
The intersection with the Bruce Highway at Elimbah is being upgraded in 2022 in conjunction with a project to expand the highway to six lanes at that point.

The intersection with the Bruce Highway at Glenview was upgraded in 2021 as part of a project to expand the highway to six lanes at that point and to improve traffic flow through the intersection.

History

In 1890 it became a railway siding known by its position on the line rather than a name, and in 1902 it was officially named Elimbah.

Some European settlement in what is now the locality of Beerburrum had occurred from 1861, but it was not until 1890 when the railway arrived that the area became accessible for new settlers. In 1916, Beerburrum was chosen to be a soldier settlement with over 550 farms allocated. Beerburrum Soldier Settlement was the largest soldier settlement in Queensland.

A coach stop on the road to the Gympie goldfields was established in what is now Glass House Mountains in 1868. 

European settlement at Beerwah began in 1877, with timber cutting and land clearing, followed by fruit growing and other forms of agriculture.

In 1871 a coach stop was established at Mellum Creek, the site of the town of Landsborough, which was so named with the arrival of the railway in 1890.

Most of this road was part of the Bruce Highway when it was declared in 1934, and remained so until 1985, when the new alignment reached Caloundra Road at Glenview.

Major intersections
All distances are from Google Maps. The road is within the Moreton Bay and Sunshine Coast local government areas.

See also

 List of road routes in Queensland
 List of numbered roads in Queensland

Notes

References

Roads in Queensland